
Gmina Bisztynek is an urban-rural gmina (administrative district) in Bartoszyce County, Warmian-Masurian Voivodeship, in northern Poland.

Villages
Apart from the town of Bisztynek, Gmina Bisztynek contains the villages and settlements of Biegonity, Bisztynek-Kolonia, Dąbrowa, Grzęda, Janowiec, Kokoszewo, Krzewina, Księżno, Łabławki, Lądek, Łędławki, Mołdyty, Niski Młyn, Nisko, Nowa Wieś Reszelska, Paluzy, Pleśnik, Pleśno, Prosity, Sątopy, Sułowo, Swędrówka, Troksy, Troszkowo, Unikowo, Warmiany, Winiec, Wojkowo and Wozławki.

Neighbouring gminas
Gmina Bisztynek is bordered by the gminas of Bartoszyce, Jeziorany, Kiwity, Kolno, Korsze and Reszel.

References
Polish official population figures 2006

Bisztynek
Bartoszyce County